Ngan or Ngân may refer to:

Ngan (Thai: , RTGS: ngan, IPA: [ŋāːn]), a unit of area, equal to 400 square metres

Surname
Yan (surname 顏), spelled Ngan based on its Cantonese pronunciation
Cherry Ngan (born 1993), Hong Kong singer, actress and model
Guy Ngan (1926–2017), New Zealand artist; media include sculpture, painting, drawing, design and architecture
Johnny Ngan (born 1949), Hong Kong film actor and television actor
Kevin Ngan (born 1983), fencer from Hong Kong, China who won a bronze medal at the 2006 Asian Games in the men's foil team competition

Given name
Ngoc Bich Ngan (born 1973), Vietnamese-Canadian singer, songwriter, artist and writer
Nguyễn Ngọc Ngạn (born 1945), Vietnamese-Canadian writer and essayist
Phạm Thanh Ngân (born 1939), former Mikoyan-Gurevich MiG-21 pilot of the Vietnamese People's Air Force
Phan Thu Ngân (born 1980), crowned the 7th Miss Vietnam in 2000